The 1938 West Tennessee State Teachers football team was an American football that represented West Tennessee State Teachers College (now known as the University of Memphis) as a member of the Southern Intercollegiate Athletic Association (SIAA) during the 1938 college football season. In its second season under head coach Allyn McKeen, the team compiled a perfect 10–0 record (7–0 against conference opponents), won the SIAA championship, and outscored opponents by a total of 281 to 41. Roland MacMackin was the team captain.

Schedule

References

West Tennessee State Teachers
Memphis Tigers football seasons
College football undefeated seasons
West Tennessee State Teachers football